The Polish Review is an English-language academic journal published quarterly in New York City by the Polish Institute of Arts and Sciences of America. The Polish Review was established in 1956.

Editors-in-chief
The following persons have been editors-in-chief of this journal:
 Stanisław Skrzypek (1956)
 Ludwik Krzyżanowski (1956–1986)
 Stanisław Barańczak (1986–1990)
 Joseph Wieczerzak (1991–2007)
 Charles S. Kraszewski (2008–2011)
 James S. Pula (2012 –2014)
 Neal Pease (2015-2020)
 Halina Filipowicz (2020-present)

Indexing 
The Polish Review is abstracted in Historical Abstracts, ABC POL SCI, America: History and Life, Index of Articles on Jewish Studies, MLA International Bibliography, and International Political Science Abstracts. It is also listed among the journals recognized by the American Historical Association.

References

Further reading

External links
 

Publications established in 1956
European studies journals
English-language journals
Polish-American culture in New York City
Quarterly journals
Works about Poland
1956 establishments in New York City